Citro is a surname. Notable people with the surname include:
 Constance F. Citro, American statistician
 Domenico Citro, Italian football player
 Joseph A. Citro, American novelist
 Ralph Citro (1926–2004), American historian
Christopher Citro, American poet